Takeshi Sasaki (born 16 July 1996) is a Japanese judoka. He is the gold medallist in the -81 kg at the 2021 Judo Grand Slam Paris

References

External links
 

1996 births
Living people
Japanese male judoka
Judoka at the 2018 Asian Games
21st-century Japanese people